Dov Davidoff is an American comedian and actor. In addition to performing regularly in clubs and colleges throughout the country, Davidoff also acted in Invincible with Mark Wahlberg, and has made guest or recurring appearances on various TV shows including Crashing, Chelsea Lately, Chappelle's Show, Jimmy Kimmel Live!, Law & Order, Raines, Maron, Whitney, Horace and Pete and The League.

Davidoff was born on September 22, 1973 in Englishtown, New Jersey, where his father owned a junkyard. He married his wife Jessica on May 18, 2016, and she gave birth to the couple's son on November 3rd, 2018.

On April 22, 2008, he released a CD entitled "The Point Is.." on Comedy Central Records.

His book Road Dog: Life and Reflections from the Road as a Stand-up Comic was released via Amazon in October, 2017.

Most recently, Davidoff has been guest starring with Ray Liotta and Jennifer Lopez on the NBC cop drama Shades of Blue. Dov is also featured as a recurring role on HBO's Crashing alongside fellow comedian and actor Pete Holmes.

References

External links

American stand-up comedians
Living people
Year of birth missing (living people)
Place of birth missing (living people)
21st-century American comedians
People from Englishtown, New Jersey